Manaivi Solle Manthiram is a 1983 Indian Tamil-language film, directed by Rama Narayanan and produced and written by P. Kalaimani. The film stars Mohan, Nalini, Pandiyan and Ilavarasi. It was dubbed in Telugu as Kodalu Diddina Kaapuram.

Plot
Thyagu (Mohan), a doctor by profession falls in love with Selvi (Nalini) and their wedding is planned. However, Thyagu's parents (Vennira Aadai Moorthy and Rajasulochana) demands huge dowry for which Selvi's father (Kallapati Singaram) agrees and pays off by selling his property. Post marriage, Selvi finds Thyagu's  parents to be irresponsible who just prefer spending money lavishly. They end up spending the entire money which they received as dowry from Selvi's father. Selvi brings this up to Thyagu. Although Thyagu understands that his parents activities are not correct, he does not have the courage to point their mistakes. Now Selvi decides to teach a lesson for Thyagu's parents.

Thyagu's sister falls in love with Selvi's brother following which she gets pregnant even before wedding. Now it is Selvi's father's turn to take revenge on Thyagu's parents by asking for the same amount as dowry in order to get them married.  Thyagu also has a younger brother Bharathan (Pandian) who is a spoilt brat just roaming around. He falls in love with a poor girl Rani (Ilavarasi) and gets married without the consent of his parents.  Thyagu decides to work overtime to earn more money as he is the only breadwinner in the family.

Thyagu gets transferred to another city and leaves alone for work.  Selvi tactfully sends Bharathan and his wife out from their home mentioning that they are not contributing for family's income. Bharathan and Rani leave their home and start a small roadside eatery which clicks well and they open a decent restaurant thereby settling well in life. Selvi also plays trick and sends Thyagu's parents away from their home. Thyagu returns home again after transferring back and is shocked to see his family members are out from his home. Meanwhile, Thyagu's sister's marriage has already happened with Selvi's brother and she has given birth to a baby as well. Thyagu visits Selvi's father and gives the dowry he requested.

Thyagu sends Selvi out from his home angered by her activities. Thyagu's home has been hypothecated to a bank and the bank officials come to seize the home for non-repayment of loan. Thyagu is devastated as he loses his job as well due to his carelessness which has resulted in a death of a patient. Knowing all this, Thyagu's parents decide to leave him and stay with Bharathan who is rich now. Thyagu is left alone and worries. Now, he realizes the value of his wife and understands that all her activities were only for the good of his family. He decides to call Selvi back, however he faints and gets admitted in hospital where it is diagnosed that high stress has resulted in some serious illness which requires an immediate surgery. Selvi comes for rescue and she pays the hospital bill with the help of the dowry which her father received and Thyagu is saved. Finally, Thyagu unites with Selvi.

Cast

Mohan as Thyagu
Nalini as Selvi
Pandiyan as Bharathan
Ilavarasi as Rani
Vennira Aadai Moorthy as Thyagu's father
Vinu Chakravarthy as Balakrishnan
Kallapetti Singaram as Selvi's father
Manohar as Gopal
Rajasulochana as Thyagu's mother
Kullamani
Yugalakshmi
T. K. S. Chandran
Cenchi Krishnan
Bailwan Renganathan
Usilimani
Sivaraman

Soundtrack
The music was composed by Ilaiyaraaja. Lyrics were by Muthulingam, Vairamuthu and Gangai Amaran.

References

External links
 
 

1983 films
Films scored by Ilaiyaraaja
1980s Tamil-language films
Films directed by Rama Narayanan